Blue County is the self-titled debut studio album by American country music duo Blue County, released in 2004 (see 2004 in country music) on Curb Records. The album's debut single, "Good Little Girls", peaked at #11 on the Billboard Hot Country Singles & Tracks (now Hot Country Songs) charts. Also released from this album were "That's Cool" (#24 on the country charts), "Nothin' but Cowboy Boots" (#38) and "That Summer Song" (#53). After these singles, the duo released two more singles for an unreleased second album, before exiting Curb in 2007.

Track listing

Personnel
Adapted from Blue County liner notes.
Blue County
Aaron Benward - vocals
Scott Reeves - vocals

Musicians
Tim Akers – keyboards
Bruce Bouton – steel guitar
Mike Brignardello – bass guitar
J. T. Corenflos – guitars
Eric Darken – percussion
Stuart Duncan – fiddle
Paul Franklin – steel guitar
Dann Huff – guitars
Gordon Kennedy – guitars
Jimmy Nichols – keyboards
Lonnie Wilson –  drums
Glenn Worf – bass guitar
Jonathan Yudkin – banjo, fiddle, mandolin, violin, viola, cello, bouzouki

Technical
Dann Huff - producer
Doug Johnson - producer
Ed Seay - recording, mixing
Hank Williams - mastering
Jonathan Yudkin - string composer and arranger on "Time Well Spent"

Chart performance

References

2004 debut albums
Blue County (duo) albums
Curb Records albums
Albums produced by Dann Huff
Albums produced by Doug Johnson (record producer)